The 1983–84 Magyar Kupa (English: Hungarian Cup) was the 44th season of Hungary's annual knock-out cup football competition.

Final

See also
 1983–84 Nemzeti Bajnokság I

References

External links
 Official site 
 soccerway.com

1983–84 in Hungarian football
1983–84 domestic association football cups
1983-84